Sean Hohneck (born 8 January 1979 in Rotorua, New Zealand) is a rugby union player for Leeds Carnegie He previously played for Rugby Viadana, playing at lock.

Hohneck joined Leeds Carnegie for the 2010-11 RFU Championship.

He is now a teacher at St Peters School in Cambridge, New Zealand

References

External links
Bristol Rugby profile
All Blacks Profile

1979 births
Living people
Bristol Bears players
Rugby union players from Rotorua
Māori All Blacks players
Rugby union locks
New Zealand expatriate sportspeople in England